Kim Chŏn-il (1537 – July 27, 1593) was a Korean military leader in the 16th century. He was a Joseon dynasty official and became a righteous army leader during the Imjin war to repel the 1592 Japanese invasion of Korea. He was killed in the second siege of Jinju in 1593.

Early life 
Kim Cheon-il was born in 1537. He was a good hearted man with a great interest in academics. When Kim was 32 years old, Seonjo of Joseon said that he was upset about not bringing Kim as one of his officials. 5 years later, Kim was recommended to get a job in the government and Kim successfully got one. For years, Kim stayed as one of Seonjo's great officials.

Outbreak of war
In 1592, Toyotomi Hideyoshi, the Taiko of Japan, invaded Korea with the intent of using it as a route to invade Ming China. His Samurai armies achieved early successes, conquering much of the southern Korean peninsula.  Kim Chŏn-il, a middle-rank official who was then fifty-five years old, raised a small militia of three hundred men in his hometown of Naju. He marched the militia north, recruiting along the way, intending to reach Uiju and defend King Seonjo from the invaders. They instead encamped on Gangwha island.

Siege of Jinju

In 1593, the Daimyo Katō Kiyomasa moved to attack the city of Jinju. This city had successfully withstood a siege the previous year, and Kato wanted revenge for the setbacks Japan had suffered in the Imjin war. Konishi Yukinaga informed Ming military advisor Shen Weijing of Kato's intent to attack, and told him that it was merely a face saving gesture rather than a new offensive.

Shen advised the Korean military to avoid Jinju, and let the Japanese destroy it. Kim Chŏn-il did not heed Shen's advice, and brought his militia into Jinju, intending to defend it from Kato. He was joined by Korean military personnel led by Hwang Jin and others, as well as another Righteous Army led by Ko Chong-hu. Jinju was encircled by Samurai armies led by Kato, Konishi, Ukita Hideie, and Kikkawa Hiroie.

The Japanese commanders sent the defenders a message demanding they surrender. Kim replied that Chinese reinforcements were coming to rescue them. This was not true; Shen Weijing and his fellow Chinese generals had decided not to defend Jinju.

On July 27, the Japanese penetrated Jinju's walls. As the Japanese massacred the remaining defenders, Kim Chŏn-il committed suicide.

In 1603, Seonjo of Joseon posthumously awarded Kim Jwacheonsoung and in 1610, Gwanghaegun of Joseon awarded Kim Yeonguijeong.

Notes

References
 
 

1537 births
1593 deaths
People of the Japanese invasions of Korea (1592–1598)
Joseon politicians